Parsteinsee is a municipality in the district of Barnim in Brandenburg in Germany.

Demography

See also
Parsteiner See

References

Localities in Barnim